Klodian Semina, also spelled Samina, (born 19 January 1989) is an Albanian footballer who currently plays for A.S.D.C. Borgomanero in the Italian fifth tier.

Club career

Early career
Semina is a Vllaznia Shkodër product, joining with them in 2000 when he was 11 years old. He was promoted to the first team during the 2005–06 season, being an unused substitute for the entire season. In the next season, Semina was able to make his Albanian Superliga debut, playing two matches throughout the 2006–07 season.

Belasitsa Petrich
On 1 February 2008, Semina moved for the first time outside the country, signing a two-year deal with Bulgarian side Belasitsa Petrich. He played with the club during the 2008–09 season, recording 25 matches and 1 goal, in the Bulgarian top flight.

Gramozi Ersekë
Semina returned in Albania in the summer of 2009 and on 1 August 2009, he signed a one-year deal with Gramozi Ersekë, who were set to play their first Albanian Superliga season in history.

Ermis Aradippou
On 13 May 2010, Semina signed a three-year contract with Cypriot side Ermis Aradippou, leaving Gramozi Ersekë after only one season. The told to the media that was very happy for this transfer, by saying: "I'm happy that I was able to reach an argument with the Cypriot directors and can say that their terms are very good."

Locarno
On 9 July 2011, he left Vllaznia Shkodër and signed with Swiss club Locarno in Challenge League. His debuted with the club on 25 July in team's opening match, playing full-90 minutes at Stadion Niedermatten. His debut was not one to celebrate as Locarno lost the match 5–2 to start the campaign in the worst way possible.

Besëlidhja Lezhë
In January 2015, during the winter transfer window, after being a free agent for almost one year, Semina signed a six-month contract with Albanian First Division side Besëlidhja Lezhë for an undisclosed fee. He made his debut with the club on 7 February 2015, playing full-90 minutes in a goalless draw against the league contenders of Tërbuni Pukë. That was his first match in a football field after 364 days since leaving Vllaznia Shkodër.

Later career
He later played in the Italian lower leagues, joining OltrepòVoghera in 2018 and Pavia a year later. In December 2019, he joined fellow league club A.S.D.C. Borgomanero.

International career

Semina is a former youth player of Albania national team, playing with U19 and Albania U21 side, but until now was not able to make it to the senior team.

Semina debuted with the U19 team on 18 October 2007 against Spain U19, playing the full 90 minutes in a 2–0 loss, in a match valid for the qualification of the 2008 UEFA European Under-19 Championship.

References

External links

 
 Profile - FSHF

1989 births
Living people
Footballers from Shkodër
Albanian footballers
Association football defenders
Albania under-21 international footballers
Albania youth international footballers
KF Vllaznia Shkodër players
PFC Belasitsa Petrich players
KS Gramozi Ersekë players
FC Locarno players
Besëlidhja Lezhë players
F.C. Pavia players
Kategoria Superiore players
Kategoria e Parë players
Swiss Challenge League players
Eccellenza players
Albanian expatriate footballers
Expatriate footballers in Bulgaria
Expatriate footballers in Switzerland
Expatriate footballers in Italy
Albanian expatriate sportspeople in Bulgaria
Albanian expatriate sportspeople in Switzerland
Albanian expatriate sportspeople in Italy